Burke Dales (born February 16, 1977) is a former professional Canadian football punter. He was signed by the Pittsburgh Steelers as an undrafted free agent in 2002. He played CIS Football with the Concordia Stingers.

Over his 9-year career Dales played for the Calgary Stampeders, Edmonton Eskimos, and Montreal Alouettes.  Dales was born in Collingwood, Ontario, and raised in Brockville, Ontario.

Professional career

Pittsburgh Steelers
After playing at Concordia University, Dales attended the Pittsburgh Steelers 2002 training camp. He also tried to make the team as a kick-off specialist. When he placekicks, he uses the straight-on style which had not been seen in the NFL since the 1980s.

Montreal Alouettes
Dales attended Montreal Alouettes's 2003 training camp and sat out the remainder of the 2003 and 2004 seasons before signing with Calgary in 2005.

Calgary Stampeders
Dales was signed as a free agent on March 8, 2005, by the Calgary Stampeders.

Prior to the Stampeders' 96th Grey Cup victory in 2008, Dales was offered a new contract to re-sign with Calgary for the 2009 CFL season but withheld signing until seeing if he could get interest from a National Football League team.

Dales re-signed with the Stampeders on March 24, 2009, after failing to gain interest from NFL teams and a reportedly higher offer from the Winnipeg Blue Bombers would have meant losing his off-season employment.

Edmonton Eskimos
After becoming a free agent in 2012, Dales signed with the Edmonton Eskimos on February 19, 2012.

On July 22, 2013, he was released by the Eskimos.

Montreal Alouettes
On October 30, 2013, Dales was signed by the Montreal Alouettes.

Retirement
Dales announced his retirement on May 16, 2014.

Personal life
Dales' sister, Stacey, is a former Women's National Basketball Association player. His cousin Jason Arnott played 18 seasons in the National Hockey League.

References

External links
Edmonton Eskimos bio

1977 births
Living people
American football punters
Calgary Stampeders players
Canadian football punters
Canadian players of American football
Concordia Stingers football players
Edmonton Elks players
Montreal Alouettes players
Sportspeople from Collingwood, Ontario
Pittsburgh Steelers players
Players of Canadian football from Ontario